Crookton is a place situated in Yavapai County, Arizona, United States. Crookton is a point on the railroad named in honor of General George Crook.

References

Geography of Yavapai County, Arizona